"Fight Music" is a hip hop single by the rap group D12 from their debut album Devil's Night. The song features various lyrics about violence and dangerous street fighting except in two verses: Bizarre's, which features various graphic subjects, namely oral sex with his grandmother, and Eminem's, which talks about the youth, how they feel and how they relate with this song and other songs. The song was produced by Dr. Dre. "Fight Music" is also included on the greatest hits disc of Shady Records' 15th anniversary compilation, Shady XV, which was released on November 24, 2014. The song was also used as an outro in the 2012 movie Project X.

According to Denaun Porter, Eminem considers this song his "best vocal performance ever, in his whole career. From the verse to the hook, he felt like that was his best."

Music video
The beginning of the video features Ice-T and different styles of music, a play on the beginning of the film The Warriors. The quotes, "can you count?" and "can you dig it?" are taken directly from the movie. The cut-scene where the radio DJ speaks is also a reference to The Warriors. The video features cameos by Fat Joe and Obie Trice. There are two versions of the video. One is the explicit version. The explicit version starts with Ice-T talking about the styles of music. However, the beginning where he says "Can you count, suckers?" has been cut. Also, instead of Eminem starting the chorus outside, he starts inside of what seems to be a city bus, with the rest of D12 seen in the background. The explicit version alters throughout the video. The clean version includes Ice-T yelling "Can you count, suckers?". The clean version also starts with Eminem starting the chorus outside with the rest of D12, instead of inside a bus. Some words have been changed or muted throughout the clean version's audio. Part of the video was shot in Coney Island, Brooklyn, and Melrose, Bronx.

Track listing
The European CD single and Europe and Australia Maxi single are available with six different covers - one of each of the D12 band members.

UK CD single

European CD single

Europe and Australia Maxi single

US 12" vinyl

UK 12" vinyl and Cassette

UK DVD single

Notes
 signifies a co-producer.

Charts

References

2001 singles
D12 songs
Shady Records singles
Aftermath Entertainment singles
Interscope Records singles
Songs written by Eminem
Song recordings produced by Dr. Dre
2001 songs
Songs written by Mike Elizondo
Songs written by Dr. Dre
Songs written by Denaun Porter
Songs written by Bizarre (rapper)